Der schwarze Kanal is a series of political propaganda programmes which was aired weekly between 1960 and 1989 by East German state television broadcaster DFF. Each edition was made up of recorded extracts from recent West German television programmes re-edited to include a communist commentary.

The 20-minute programme was usually scheduled for transmission at around 21:30 CET on Monday evenings (which repeated again on Tuesday mornings at 11:30), before or after some popular item in the hope that viewers tuning in early to catch the film would see the programme. According to some sources, official surveys gave a 5% audience figure.

The title sequence featured an eagle (symbol of the Federal Republic) with a black, white and red chest band representing their flag of the German Empire during the pre-World War I era, while the antennas also featured a parody of the ARD's Tagesschau title sequence between 1956 and 1973.

History
The programme was hosted by Karl-Eduard von Schnitzler and began on 21 March 1960, within the name "Black Channel" is a play on words: in the German language "black channel" is a euphemism by plumbers for a sewer (compare English soil pipe). The name and the concept of the programme were originally a reaction to a West German programme named Die rote Optik ("The Red Viewpoint") authored by journalist Thilo Koch, which ran between 1958 and 1960 and analysed East German television clips. Although the programme was primarily intended for domestic consumption, as the makers (at least in the early days) hoped that those in the West who could receive DFF would also watch. The tones of his speech were described as polemical and aggressive by the Institute of Philology of the Ludwig Maximilian University of Munich.

The geography of divided Germany meant that West German television signals (particularly ARD) could be received fairly readily in most of East Germany. Areas with no reception (black) such as parts of Eastern Saxony around Dresden were jokingly referred to as "Valley of the Clueless" (Tal der Ahnungslosen), showing acronyms ZDF and ARD accounted for Zentrales Deutsches Fernsehen Außer Rügen und Dresden (Central German TV except Rügen and Dresden). Whilst radio signals from international broadcasters like the BBC and the American-backed local station RIAS in West Berlin could be jammed, it was diplomatically and technically awkward to block West German television as it would have been impossible to do so (with any degree of effectiveness) without affecting reception in parts of West Germany as well which (apart from being outlawed by treaty) in turn could have prompted the West Germans to retaliate against Eastern broadcasts.

The solution as seen by DFF, was to record items from the ARD and ZDF that were unwelcome in the East or provided a different spin on a news story and replay the items on the main DFF1 channel with a commentary "explaining" what was really "meant" by the item, or how the item was "untrue" or "flawed".

The programme ceased broadcasting on 30 October 1989, just ahead of the opening of the borders with the west on 9 November, when the East German television service declared itself "free of government interference" before it merged less than a year later with its formerly-rival West German television networks as a result of reunification. In 1992, ORB broadcast a last edition made at the end of 1991, with additional new comments himself by Schnitzler. On 9 November 2009, ZDF broadcast the mockumentary Der schwarze Kanal kehrt zurück ("The Black Channel Returns"), which parodies Schnitzler's manipulative handling of archive material.

Concept
Other representatives of the programme included Günter Herlt (26 editions), Ulrich Makosch (19 editions) and Heinz Grote (144 editions) who instead employed a less aggressive tone, as well as various speakers were Götz Förster (four editions), Volker Ott and Albert Reisz (both two editions) who only commented on some data.

As stated on the website of the German Broadcasting Archive as the estate administrator of East German television, which only recorded the clips for magazine programmes but not the live commentaries and introductions by the moderators. In this case, neither the recordings of the comments have survived which consisted of excerpts from West German television because Schnitzler usually had them destroyed just a few days after they were broadcast, within the manuscripts have been largely preserved and are also located.

Reception
Schnitzler originally worked at NWDR was one of the best-known commentators in the East German media, he was often called "Karl-Eduard" and in one joke was said as an allusion to the fact that even before uttered his name completely had been changed. Furthermore, the singer-songwriter Wolf Biermann railed against Schnitzler on 1 December 1989 in his Ballade von den verdorbenen Greisen ("Ballad of the Corrupt Old Men") stating that the commentator, nicknamed "Sudel-ede".

Especially in the 1960s and early 1970s, the programme was sometimes regarded as a kind of mandatory viewing in some industries. For example, the content of Der schwarze Kanal was used in army political education (Nationale Volksarmee or Grenztruppen) and at discretion in civic lessons in schools.

The German Broadcasting Archive accused Schnitzler of manipulating the statements through significant cuts in scenes and re-editing of footage.

Availability
Around 350 of the 1,519 editions were recorded by West German institutions during their live broadcast on East German television are now in the possession of this archive. In the course of German reunification, the scripts of the broadcast and the complete writings of Schnitzler's comments are available as PDF files on the German Broadcasting Archive website as mentioned in the external links. In addition, 33 editions of Der schwarze Kanal are commercially available in a 6-DVD box set released on 27 October 2016 with a total of twelve hours.

In 2004, the daily newspaper Junge Welt has used the title "Schwarzer Kanal" for a weekly column, which also been produced as a video and podcast since 2019. In 2011, the conservative journalist Jan Fleischhauer has called his online column for Der Spiegel.

The programme was featured in the 1999 movie Sonnenallee and the 2019 TV series Deutschland 86.

See also
 Aktuelle Kamera
 Ossi and Wessi
 Eastern Bloc media and propaganda

References

1960s German television series
1970s German television series
1980s German television series
Television in East Germany
1960 establishments in East Germany
1960 German television series debuts
1989 disestablishments in East Germany
1989 German television series endings
German-language television shows
Propaganda television broadcasts
Criticism of journalism